Seery is a surname of Irish origin. Notable people with the surname include:

Colin Seery (born 1957), Australian rules footballer
Emmett Seery (1861–1930), American baseball player
Eva Seery (1874–1937), Australian political organiser
John Seery (born 1941), American artist
Neil Seery (born 1979), Irish mixed martial artist
Thomas Seery (born 1945), American lawyer and politician

References

Surnames of Irish origin